The 2003 Gateshead Borough Council election was held on 1 May 2003 to elect members of Gateshead Council in Tyne and Wear, England. One third of the council was up for election and the Labour Party kept overall control of the council.

After the election, the composition of the council was:
Labour 46
Liberal Democrat 19
Liberal 1

Campaign
The Labour Party feared that the Iraq War would cause them to lose ground in the election, after even their own councillors in Gateshead had passed a motion in February opposing the war. Labour hoped to separate the election from national issues by focusing on the council's record including the fact that council was rated as excellent in national league tables. The Liberal Democrats focused their attacks on the level of Council Tax including the 9.8% rise for Gateshead in 2003.

The main battleground was seen as being in Winlaton ward which the Liberal Democrats had won in the 2000 election but Labour had retained in 2002. As well as the two main parties on the council, the Conservatives contested all wards, while the British National Party put up 8 candidates and the Green Party 3 candidates.

As in the previous election in 2002 the election was held under all postal voting. As a result, overall turnout was 54.67% in Gateshead, which was the third highest turnout in the 2003 United Kingdom local elections with only the elections in Hertfordshire and Copeland seeing a higher turnout.

Election result
The results saw no seats change hands between the parties with the Labour party pleased at managing to hold all of the seats they were defending. The result was seen as a blow to the Liberal Democrats chances of taking the Blaydon parliamentary seat at the next general election.

Ward results

References

2003 English local elections
2003
21st century in Tyne and Wear